Achatinella papyracea is an extinct species of air-breathing land snail, a terrestrial pulmonate gastropod mollusk in the family Achatinellidae. This species was endemic to Oahu, Hawaii.

References

†papyracea
Extinct gastropods
Molluscs of Hawaii
Endemic fauna of Hawaii
Taxonomy articles created by Polbot
ESA endangered species